The 1938–39 Irish Cup was the 59th edition of the premier knock-out cup competition in Northern Irish football. 

Linfield won the tournament for the 20th time, defeating Ballymena United 2–0 in the final at Solitude.

Results

First round

|}

Replay

|}

Quarter-finals

|}

Semi-finals

|}

Final

References

External links
 Northern Ireland Cup Finals. Rec.Sport.Soccer Statistics Foundation (RSSSF)

Irish Cup seasons
1938–39 domestic association football cups
1938–39 in Northern Ireland association football